St Martin's Basilica (French - basilique Saint-Martin) in Liège, is a Roman Catholic church situated on the Publémont hill in the city centre. It was initially built as a Romanesque structure in the 10th century, which in 1246 held the first celebration of an annual 'Fête-Dieu', the festival later known as Corpus Christi. This structure was replaced by a Gothic building in the 16th century. Up until the Liège Revolution it was one of the seven collegiate churches of Liège. In 1886 it was promoted to the rank of minor basilica.

Sources
http://fr.structurae.de/structures/data/?ID=s0056128
http://www.upsaintmartin.be/medias/files/visite-guidee-de-la-basilique-st-martin-liege-1.pdf

Liege
Gothic architecture in Belgium
16th-century architecture
Former collegiate churches in Belgium
Saint-Martin